Dale Anderson (21 May 1953 – 2 October 2019) was a Canadian boxer. He competed in the men's featherweight event at the 1972 Summer Olympics. At the 1972 Summer Olympics, he lost in his first fight to Clemente Rojas of Colombia.

References

External links
 

1953 births
2019 deaths
Canadian male boxers
Olympic boxers of Canada
Boxers at the 1972 Summer Olympics
Sportspeople from Yellowknife
Commonwealth Games medallists in boxing
Commonwealth Games bronze medallists for Canada
Boxers at the 1974 British Commonwealth Games
Featherweight boxers
Medallists at the 1974 British Commonwealth Games